Grooverider: Slot Car Thunder (known in Europe as Grooverider: Slot Car Racing) is a racing video game released in 2003, developed by British studio King of the Jungle. It features a selection of over 40 fictional slot cars and 5 locations set in a virtual house. The gameplay features changing lanes to avoid obstacles or overtake, 3 performance levels of cars and power-ups.

Reception

The GameCube and Xbox versions received "generally unfavorable reviews" according to the review aggregation website Metacritic.

References

External links
 

2003 video games
Encore Software games
GameCube games
King of the Jungle games
Multiplayer and single-player video games
PlayStation 2 games
Racing video games
Video games developed in the United Kingdom
Xbox games